The Matanikau River of Guadalcanal, Solomon Islands, is located in the northwest part of the island.  During the World War II Guadalcanal campaign, several significant engagements occurred between United States and Japanese forces near the river.

History
The Matanikau River was the scene of four important battles in the Guadalcanal Campaign of World War II, fought by elements of the United States Marine Corps and the Imperial Japanese Army from 19 August to 9 November 1942.

References

- Interactive animation of the battle

- Web site with many pictures of Guadalcanal battle sites from 1942 and how they look now.

Guadalcanal
Rivers of the Solomon Islands